Jonathan Lachlan Stewart is a Canadian actor and playwright.

Stewart was born and educated in Edmonton, Alberta, and began writing plays in elementary school, when he was twelve years old. Some were performed at the Edmonton International Fringe Festival. Later, he studied theatre at Studio 58, in Vancouver, British Columbia. In 2004, he co-founded a theatre company, Surreal SoReal, with Vincent Forcier, which tours the country with original plays.

Stewart's play writing credits include Little Room (nominated for two Edmonton Sterling Awards), Grumplestock's (co-written and published in the NextFest anthology), Twisted Thing (honorable mention, Larry Corse world-wide playwriting contest), Eleanor, and The City Green. He has been nominated for a Jessie Award for his acting in Vancouver theatre.

Stewart also works as a voice actor with the Calgary-based Blue Water Studios, to voice Kamille Bidan in the English dub of Mobile Suit Zeta Gundam. He was also the voice of Kamille in most of the Gundam games that Kamille appeared in until the Dynasty Warriors Gundam series. Currently he is providing the voice of Miwa for the first season of the English adaptation of the Cardfight!! Vanguard.

References

External links
 Surreal So Real Theatre, Official site.
Jonathan Lachlan-Stewart at Crystal Acids
 
 

Living people
Year of birth missing (living people)
Canadian male stage actors
Canadian male voice actors
21st-century Canadian dramatists and playwrights
Male actors from Edmonton
Writers from Edmonton
Canadian male dramatists and playwrights
21st-century Canadian male writers
Studio 58 people